Martins Igbanu (born April 12, 1997) is a Nigerian professional basketball player for Caen Basket Calvados of the Nationale Masculine 1. He played college basketball for the Tulsa Golden Hurricane.

Early life and high school career
Igbanu grew up in Lagos, Nigeria and played soccer as a child. At the age of 14, he decided to try basketball and practiced every day at Rowe Park.  When he was 15, Igbanu came to the United States and enrolled at Covenant Christian Ministries Academy in Marietta, Georgia. He initially felt homesick and was planning to travel back to Nigeria when his mother convinced him to stay longer. As a senior, he averaged 19.5 points, 9.3 rebounds, 2.1 assists, 1.8 steals and 1.0 block per game. In September 2015, Igbanu committed to play at Tulsa over offers from Cincinnati, Iowa State and Tennessee. "I wanted to go to a good school where I could play basketball and also receive the best education, like TU offers," he said.

College career
Igbanu averaged 6.3 points and 4 rebounds per game while shooting 55.9 percent from the floor as a freshman. As a sophomore, he averaged 9.4 points and 5.1 rebounds per game, shooting and 52.9 percent from the field. Igbanu averaged 12.5 points and 5.7 rebounds per game as a junior. After struggling during nonconference play of his senior season, Igbanu began coming off the bench and his scoring improved. On February 9, 2020, he scored a career-high 30 points in an 83–75 loss to UCF. As a senior, Igbanu averaged 13.6 points and 5.0 rebounds per game. He earned First Team All-American Athletic Conference as well as conference Sixth Man of the Year honors.

Professional career
On September 16, 2020, Igbanu signed his first professional contract with Mladost Zemun of the Adriatic League and the Basketball League of Serbia. He averaged 12.4 points, 6.0 rebounds and 1.0 assist per game in the Serbian league. On July 9, 2021, Igbanu signed with Denain Voltaire Basket of the LNB Pro B. On November 3, he signed with Rouen Métropole Basket. Igbanu signed with Caen Basket Calvados of the Nationale Masculine 1 on January 3, 2022.

Career statistics

College

|-
| style="text-align:left;"| 2016–17
| style="text-align:left;"| Tulsa
| 32 || 19 || 15.3 || .559 || .556 || .589 || 4.0 || .3 || .2 || .3 || 6.3
|-
| style="text-align:left;"| 2017–18
| style="text-align:left;"| Tulsa
| 31 || 23 || 22.5 || .529 || .286 || .720 || 5.1 || .5 || .3 || .2 || 9.4
|-
| style="text-align:left;"| 2018–19
| style="text-align:left;"| Tulsa
| 32 || 32 || 27.1 || .616 || .000 || .661 || 5.7 || .7 || .6 || .3 || 12.5
|-
| style="text-align:left;"| 2019–20
| style="text-align:left;"| Tulsa
| 31 || 12 || 26.6 || .561 || .333 || .691 || 5.0 || .8 || .5 || .3 || 13.6
|- class="sortbottom"
| style="text-align:center;" colspan="2"| Career
| 126 || 86 || 22.9 || .570 || .333 || .670 || 5.0 || .6 || .4 || .3 || 10.4

References

External links
Tulsa Golden Hurricane bio

1997 births
Living people
Basketball League of Serbia players
KK Mladost Zemun players
Nigerian men's basketball players
Nigerian expatriate basketball people in France
Nigerian expatriate basketball people in Serbia
Nigerian expatriate basketball people in the United States
Small forwards
Sportspeople from Lagos
Tulsa Golden Hurricane men's basketball players
21st-century Nigerian people